Tivaevae or tivaivai in the Cook Islands, tifaifai in French Polynesia, is a form of artistic quilting traditionally done by Polynesian women. The word literally means "patches", in reference to the pieces of material sewn together. The tivaevae are either made by one woman or can be created in groups of women called vainetini. The vainetini use this time together to bond, sing and catch up on village news.

Traditional uses
Tivaevae are often given on very special occasions either to important visitors, as birthday and wedding gifts or used to cover the body of a loved one who has died. They are often displayed during important events like the traditional boys' hair-cutting ceremonies, birthdays and weddings.

By custom, a tivaevae is not measured by monetary value nor production cost. Its value is said to be reflected by the love and patience that the creator(s) have put into making a stunning work of art. Cook Islands women often described their tivaevae as being "something from the heart". Artist Vereara Maeva-Taripo has described tivaevae as central to the identity of Cook Islands women.

Tivaevae are rarely seen for sale on the islands. The Atiu Fibre Arts Studio on Atiu is the only place in the Cook Islands where they are commercially produced and available for purchase.

History
The tivaevae's origins are uncertain. Rongokea (1992) believes it to be an imported art form, and cites two sets of Christian missionaries in the 19th century as possible origins. While it is known that these female missionaries taught the indigenous women how to sew, it is not certain that they taught them the craft of quilting or making bed coverlets. The appliqué style of tivaevae quilting appears to have been influence by Pennsylvanian German scherenschnitte or Victorian folded paper-cutting traditions. Multiple origins and influences thus seem likely.

As an art form, tivaevae replaced barkcloth production in Tahiti and the Cook Islands by the late 19th century: the function and nature of barkcloth production was transferred to tivaevae.

References

Further reading

External links
Tivaevae in the collection of the Museum of New Zealand Te Papa Tongarewa
Tivaevae - Cook Islands communal art at the www.ck site

Cook Islands culture
Tahitian culture
Quilting